Raúl Javiel Cabrera (1919–1992) was an Uruguayan painter.  He signed his paintings Raúl Javiel Cabrera or Javiel Raúl Cabrera.

1919 births
1992 deaths
People from Montevideo
20th-century Uruguayan painters
Uruguayan male artists
Male painters
20th-century Uruguayan male artists